The Rue de la République is a street located in the 1st and 2nd arrondissements of Lyon, France. It links the Place de la Comédie in the north to Place Le Viste in the south, just next to Place Bellecour, via the Place de la République.

It is the main shopping street of the city. This zone is served by the Lyon Metro stations Hôtel de Ville – Louis Pradel (Line A and Line C), Bellecour (Line A) and Cordeliers (Line A). The street belongs to the zone classified as World Heritage Site by UNESCO.

A street with an identical name exists in many other French cities, most notably in Marseille, where it links the Vieux-Port with the La Joliette neighbourhood.

History
After his appointment in 1853, the prefect of Rhône and Mayor of Lyon Claude-Marius Vaïsse decided to create three new roads connecting Place Bellecour to other major squares of the Presqu'île:
 Rue Victor-Hugo, connecting Place Bellecour and Place Carnot
 The Rue de l'Impératrice, then renamed Rue de l'Hôtel-de-Ville and then Rue du Président-Édouard-Herriot, between Place Bellecour and the Place des Terreaux
 Rue Impériale (1862–1871), later renamed the Rue de Lyon (1871–1878), then Rue de la République (since August–September 1878), which leads from Place Louis Pradel (where are the Hôtel de Ville and the Opera) to Place Bellecour.

Two squares have been created on this occasion, both located along the Rue de la République: Place Impériale (now Place de la République) and the Place des Cordeliers. The street, long over a kilometre, follows a southwest–northeast axis from Place Bellecour to the Place de la République, then a north–south axis to Place Louis Pradel.

In 1894, President of France Sadi Carnot was assassinated just near the Palace of Commerce, located on the Place des Cordeliers. A red stone on the Rue de la République marks the place of the assassination.

In the 1970s, the construction of Lyon Metro Line A generated the digging of trenches on the entire street.

The location of the Rue de la République, in the center of the city, and its large number of shops make the street one of the most frequented ones of Lyon by day and night. It is also known by its apocope, "Rue de la Ré".

Trades
Like the Avenue des Champs-Élysées in Paris, the Rue de la République attracts a large number of signs, including:
 Luxury shops
 Cheap shops, including Cheap (Prisunic), demolished in 2006, and the fast-food Mac Donald
 Cinemas such as Pathé Lyon-Bellecour and Pathé Lyon-Cordeliers (ex Nefs 8) and CNP Odéon both located in adjacent streets
 Major brands of distribution, such as Fnac Bellecour
 Many restaurants and cafeterias

Notable monuments and buildings
The Rue de la République is lined with Haussman-style buildings, constructed in the 19th century when the street was created.
 The former headquarters of the newspaper Le Progrès, now occupied by Fnac Bellecour. There is a mosaic "RF" meaning "République Française". This building located at 85 Rue de la République was devised by Émile Étienne Guimet, initially for a theatre
 Cinema Pathé surmounted by a belfry with a rooster at the top, a rare example of Art Deco style in Lyon
 The Palais du Commerce or Palais de la Bourse, headquarters of Chambre de commerce et d'industrie de Lyon and the Bourse de Lyon, with the nearby Church of St. Bonaventure (Place des Cordeliers)
 The Nouveau Grand Bazar, occupied by shops. The building looks very modern by contrast with the surrounding ones
 The Hôtel de Ville and the Opéra Nouvel, both located at the north end of town, Place de la Comédie.

Gallery

References

1st arrondissement of Lyon
2nd arrondissement of Lyon
Republique
World Heritage Sites in France
Shopping districts and streets in France
Pedestrian streets in France